is a Japanese actress and singer.

Life and career
She debuted as an actress in 1981 with Mōningu Mūn wa Sozatsu ni. Her single Dansu wa Umaku Odorenai, released in July 1982, was a hit, selling 800,000 copies.

References

External links

1959 births
Living people
Japanese actresses
Japanese women singers
Actors from Fukuoka Prefecture
Musicians from Fukuoka Prefecture